Basudeb Das Baul is a Bengali baul singer and musician from Bolpur in Birbhum district, West Bengal, India; who also plays khamak, ektara, and dotara as an accompaniment. He is known for pioneering traditional Baul music on the international music scene. He also works on the music score for the Australian film The Waiting City as a featured soloist in 2009. A critically acclaimed Bangladeshi movie "Hawa" also featured one of his celebrated song "Atta baje deri koris na" in his own voice.

Early life
Basudeb was growing up in a village twenty-five kilometres away from Santiniketan, West Bengal, India. Though he spent most of the time of his life at Santiniketan. Where Basudeb became friends with a number of singers, including Shanti Deb Ghosh, Prabhat Mukharjee and Paban Das Baul. He started singing folk songs since his age of thirteen.

Basudeb took baul lessons from several mentors like Shwapan Chatterjee, Dinanath Das Baul, Naran Das, Baka Sham Das, and Bishwanath Das. He collaborated Kolkata Jazz Festival since 2004 with Tanmoy Bose. He also performed at Dhaka International Folk Fest Concert, 2017 in Dhaka, Bangladesh.

In 2009, Basudeb's debut solo studio album Aat Kuthuri Noy Doroja was released by Folkpick.

Personal life
Basudeb is married and lives in birbhum. He has a daughter named Anita and a son Bhola.

Discography

Filmscores
The Waiting City (2009) - featured soloist

Concerts
 Dhaka International Folk Fest - 2017

See also
List of Baul artists

References

External links

Basudeb Das Baul at last.fm

Living people
Year of birth missing (living people)
Bengali singers
Bengali musicians
Indian male folk singers
People from Birbhum district
Musicians from West Bengal